Chesnee High School is a 9–12 Grade Campus located in the northern part of Spartanburg County, South Carolina.

The campus is located in the foothills of the Blue Ridge Mountains.

The school has an average enrollment of approximately 700 students and offers numerous sports including: football, baseball, softball, competitive cheer, wrestling, golf, tennis, fishing, and competitive marching band. Chesnee High School's Baseball and Competitive Cheer programs have each won 5 State Championships. Chesnee High School also holds a marching band competition named the Eagle Classic. 

The school's staff includes 3 administrators, 45 teachers and 32 support staff.

Athletics

State championships 
 Baseball: 1983, 1984, 1988, 2010, 2013
 Competitive Cheer: 2013, 2014, 2015, 2019
 Golf - Girls: 2021
 Track - Boys: 2010
 Volleyball: 2020

References

External links

Spartanburg District 2 website
Chesnee High School website 
Chesnee Eagle Classic website

Public high schools in South Carolina
Schools in Spartanburg County, South Carolina
Educational institutions established in 1911
1911 establishments in South Carolina